Azithromycin, sold under the brand names Zithromax (in oral form) and Azasite (as an eye drop), is an antibiotic medication used for the treatment of a number of bacterial infections. This includes middle ear infections, strep throat, pneumonia, traveler's diarrhea, and certain other intestinal infections. Along with other medications, it may also be used for malaria. It can be taken by mouth or intravenously.

Common side effects include nausea, vomiting, diarrhea and upset stomach. An allergic reaction, such as anaphylaxis, QT prolongation, or a type of diarrhea caused by Clostridium difficile is possible. No harm has been found with its use during pregnancy. Its safety during breastfeeding is not confirmed, but it is likely safe. Azithromycin is an azalide, a type of macrolide antibiotic. It works by decreasing the production of protein, thereby stopping bacterial growth.

Azithromycin was discovered in 1980 by the Yugoslav pharmaceutical company Pliva and approved for medical use under the brand name Sumamed in 1988. It is on the World Health Organization's List of Essential Medicines. The World Health Organization classifies it as critically important for human medicine. It is available as a generic medication and is sold under many trade names worldwide. In 2020, it was the 68th most commonly prescribed medication in the United States, with more than 10million prescriptions.

Medical uses 
Azithromycin is used to treat diverse infections, including:
 Acute bacterial sinusitis due to H. influenzae, M. catarrhalis, or S. pneumoniae. Other agents, such as amoxicillin/clavulanate are generally preferred, however.
 Acute otitis media caused by H. influenzae, M. catarrhalis or S. pneumoniae. Azithromycin is not, however, a first-line agent for this condition. Amoxicillin or another beta lactam antibiotic is generally preferred.
 Community-acquired pneumonia due to C. pneumoniae, H. influenzae, M. pneumoniae, or S. pneumoniae
 Genital ulcer disease (chancroid) in men due to H. ducrey
 Pharyngitis or tonsillitis caused by S. pyogenes as an alternative to first-line therapy in individuals who cannot use first-line therapy
 Prevention and treatment of acute bacterial exacerbations of chronic obstructive pulmonary disease due to H. influenzae, M. catarrhalis, or S. pneumoniae. The benefits of long-term prophylaxis must be weighed on a patient-by-patient basis against the risk of cardiovascular and other adverse effects.
 Trachoma due to C. trachomatis
 Uncomplicated skin infections due to S. aureus, S. pyogenes, or S. agalactiae
 Urethritis and cervicitis due to C. trachomatis or N. gonorrhoeae. In combination with ceftriaxone, azithromycin is part of the United States Centers for Disease Control-recommended regimen for the treatment of gonorrhea. Azithromycin is active as monotherapy in most cases, but the combination with ceftriaxone is recommended based on the relatively low barrier to resistance development in gonococci and due to frequent co-infection with C. trachomatis and N. gonorrhoeae.

Bacterial susceptibility 
Azithromycin has relatively broad but shallow antibacterial activity. It inhibits some Gram-positive bacteria, some Gram-negative bacteria, and many atypical bacteria.

A strain of gonorrhea reported to be highly resistant to azithromycin was found in the population in 2015. Neisseria gonorrhoeae is normally susceptible to azithromycin, but the drug is not widely used as monotherapy due to a low barrier to resistance development. Extensive use of azithromycin has resulted in growing Streptococcus pneumoniae resistance.

Aerobic and facultative Gram-positive microorganisms
 Staphylococcus aureus (Methicillin-sensitive only)
 Streptococcus agalactiae
 Streptococcus pneumoniae
 Streptococcus pyogenes

Aerobic and facultative anaerobic Gram-negative microorganisms
 Bordetella pertussis
 Haemophilus ducreyi
 Haemophilus influenzae
 Legionella pneumophila
 Moraxella catarrhalis
 Neisseria gonorrhoeae

Anaerobic microorganisms
 Peptostreptococcus species
 Prevotella bivia

Other microorganisms
 Chlamydia trachomatis
 Chlamydophila pneumoniae
 Mycoplasma genitalium
 Mycoplasma pneumoniae
 Ureaplasma urealyticum

Pregnancy and breastfeeding
No harm has been found with use during pregnancy. However, there are no adequate well-controlled studies in pregnant women.

The safety of the medication during breastfeeding is unclear. It was reported that because only low levels are found in breast milk and the medication has also been used in young children, it is unlikely that breastfed infants would have adverse effects. Nevertheless, it is recommended that the drug be used with caution during breastfeeding.

Airway diseases
Azithromycin appears to be effective in the treatment of chronic obstructive pulmonary disease through its suppression of inflammatory processes. And potentially useful in asthma and sinusitis via this mechanism. Azithromycin is believed to produce its effects through suppressing certain immune responses that may contribute to inflammation of the airways.

Adverse effects 
Most common adverse effects are diarrhea (5%), nausea (3%), abdominal pain (3%), and vomiting. Fewer than 1% of people stop taking the drug due to side effects. Nervousness, skin reactions, and anaphylaxis have been reported. Clostridium difficile infection has been reported with use of azithromycin. Azithromycin does not affect the efficacy of birth control unlike some other antibiotics such as rifampin. Hearing loss has been reported.

Occasionally, people have developed cholestatic hepatitis or delirium. Accidental intravenous overdose in an infant caused severe heart block, resulting in residual encephalopathy.

In 2013 the FDA issued a warning that azithromycin "can cause abnormal changes in the electrical activity of the heart that may lead to a potentially fatal irregular heart rhythm." The FDA noted in the warning a 2012 study that found the drug may increase the risk of death, especially in those with heart problems, compared with those on other antibiotics such as amoxicillin or no antibiotic. The warning indicated people with preexisting conditions are at particular risk, such as those with QT interval prolongation, low blood levels of potassium or magnesium, a slower than normal heart rate, or those who use certain drugs to treat abnormal heart rhythms.

It has been reported that azithromycin blocks autophagy and may predispose cystic fibrosis patients to mycobacterial infection.

Pharmacology

Mechanism of action 
Azithromycin prevents bacteria from growing by interfering with their protein synthesis. It binds to the 50S subunit of the bacterial ribosome, thus inhibiting translation of mRNA. Nucleic acid synthesis is not affected.

Pharmacokinetics 
Azithromycin is an acid-stable antibiotic, so it can be taken orally with no need of protection from gastric acids. It is readily absorbed, but absorption is greater on an empty stomach. Time to peak concentration (Tmax) in adults is 2.1 to 3.2 hours for oral dosage forms. Due to its high concentration in phagocytes, azithromycin is actively transported to the site of infection. During active phagocytosis, large concentrations are released. The concentration of azithromycin in the tissues can be over 50 times higher than in plasma due to ion trapping and its high lipid solubility. Azithromycin's half-life allows a large single dose to be administered and yet maintain bacteriostatic levels in the infected tissue for several days.

Following a single dose of 500 mg, the apparent terminal elimination half-life of azithromycin is 68 hours. Biliary excretion of azithromycin, predominantly unchanged, is a major route of elimination. Over the course of a week, about 6% of the administered dose appears as an unchanged drug in urine.

History 
A team of researchers at the pharmaceutical company Pliva in Zagreb, Croatia,—Gabrijela Kobrehel, Gorjana Radobolja-Lazarevski, and Zrinka Tamburašev, led by Slobodan Đokić—discovered azithromycin in 1980. The company Pliva patented it in 1981. In 1986, Pliva and Pfizer signed a licensing agreement, which gave Pfizer exclusive rights for the sale of azithromycin in Western Europe and the United States. Pliva put its azithromycin on the market in Central and Eastern Europe under the brand name Sumamed in 1988. Pfizer launched azithromycin under Pliva's license in other markets under the brand name Zithromax in 1991. Patent protection ended in 2005.

Society and culture

Available forms 
Azithromycin is available as a generic medication. Azithromycin is commonly administered in film-coated tablet, capsule, oral suspension, intravenous injection, granules for suspension in sachet, and ophthalmic solution.

Usage
In 2010, azithromycin was the most prescribed antibiotic for outpatients in the US, whereas in Sweden, where outpatient antibiotic use is a third as prevalent, macrolides are only on 3% of prescriptions. In 2017, azithromycin was the second most prescribed antibiotic for outpatients in the United States.

It is sold under many trade names worldwide including 3-Micina, A Sai Qi, Abacten, Abbott, Acex, Acithroc, Actazith, Agitro, Ai Mi Qi, Amixef, Amizin, Amovin, An Mei Qin, Ao Li Ping, Apotex, Lebanon, Aratro, Aruzilina, Arzomicin, Arzomidol, Asizith, Asomin, Astidal, Astro, Athofix, Athxin, Atizor, Atromizin, Avalon, AZ, AZA, Azacid, Azadose, Azalid, Azalide, AzaSite, Azath, Azatril, Azatril, Azax, Azee, Azeecor, Azeeta, Azelide, Azeltin, Azenil, Azeptin, Azerkym, Azi, Aziact, Azibact, Azibactron, Azibay, Azibect, Azibest, Azibiot, Azibiotic, Azicare, Azicin, Azicine, Aziclass, Azicom, Azicure, Azid, Azidose, Azidraw, Azifam, Azifarm, Azifast, Azifine, Azigen, Azigram, Azigreat, Azikare, Azilide, Azilife, Azilip, Azilup, Azimac, Azimax, Azimed, Azimepha, Azimex, Azimit, Azimix, Azimon, Azimore, Azimycin, Azimycine, Azin, Azindamon, Azinew, Azinex, Azinif, Azinil, Azintra, Aziom, Azipar, Aziped, Aziphar, Azipin, Azipro, Aziprome, Aziquilab, Azirace, Aziram, Aziresp, Aziride, Azirol, Azirom, Azirox, Azirute, Azirutec, Aziset, Azisis, Azison, Azissel, Aziswift, Azit, Azita, Azitam, Azitex, Azith, Azithral, Azithrin, Azithro, Azithrobeta, Azithrocin, Azithrocine, Azithromax, Azithromed, Azithromicina, Azithromycin, Azithromycine, Azithromycinum, Azithrovid, Azitic, Azitive, Azitome, Azitrac, Azitral, Azitrax, Azitredil, Azitrex, Azitrim, Azitrin, Azitrix, Azitro, Azitrobac, Azitrocin, Azitroerre, Azitrogal, Azitrolabsa, Azitrolid, Azitrolit, Azitrom, Azitromac, Azitromax, Azitromek, Azitromicin, Azitromicina, Azitromycin, Azitromycine, Azitrona, Azitropharma, Azitroteg, Azitrox, Azitsa, Azitus, Azivar, Azivirus, Aziwill, Aziwok, Azix, Azizox, Azmycin, Azo, Azobat, Azocin, Azoget, Azoheim, Azoksin, Azom, Azomac, Azomax, Azomex, Azomycin, Azomyne, Azores, Azorox, Azostar, Azot, Azoxin, Azras, Azro, Azrocin, Azrolid, Azromax, Azrosin, Aztin, Aztrin, Aztro, Aztrogecin, Azvig, Azycin, Azycyna, Azydrop, Azypin, Azytact, Azytan, Azyter, Azyter, Azyth, Azywell, Azza, Ba Qi, Bactizith, Bactrazol, Bai Ke De Rui, Batif, Bazyt, Bezanin, Bin Qi, Binozyt, BinQi, Biocine, Biozit, Bo Kang, Canbiox, Cetaxim, Charyn, Chen Yu, Cinalid, Cinetrin, Clamelle, Clearsing, Corzi, Cozith, Cronopen, Curazith, Delzosin, Dentazit, Disithrom, Doromax, Doyle, Elzithro, Eniz, Epica, Ethrimax, Ezith, Fabodrox, Fabramicina, Feng Da Qi, Figothrom, Floctil, Flumax, Fu Qi-Hua Yuan, Fu Rui Xin, Fuqixing, Fuxin-Hai Xin Pharm, Geozif, Geozit, Gitro, Goldamycin, Gramac, Gramokil, Hemomicin, Hemomycin, I-Thro, Ilozin, Imexa, Inedol, Infectomycin, Iramicina, Itha, Jin Nuo, Jin Pai Qi, Jinbo, Jun Jie, Jun Wei Qing, Kai Qi, Kang Li Jian, Kang Qi, Katrozax, Ke Lin Da, Ke Yan Li, Koptin, Kuai Yu, L-Thro, Laz, Legar, Lg-Thral, Li Ke Si, Li Li Xing, Li Qi, Lin Bi, Lipuqi, Lipuxin, Lizhu Qile, Loromycin, Lu Jia Kang, Luo Bei Er, Luo Qi, Maazi, Macroazi, Macromax, Macrozit, Maczith, Makromicin, Maxmor, Mazit, Mazitrom, Medimacrol, Meithromax, Mezatrin, Ming Qi Xin, Misultina, Na Qi, Nadymax, Naxocina, Neblic, Nemezid, Neofarmiz, Nifostin, Nobaxin, Nokar, Novatrex, Novozithron, Novozitron, Nurox, Odaz, Odazyth, Onzet, Oranex, Oranex, Ordipha, Orobiotic, Pai Fen, Pai Fu, Paiqi, Pediazith, Portex, Pu He, Pu Le Qi, Pu Yang, Qi Gu Mei, Qi Mai Xing, Qi Nuo, Qi Tai, Qi Xian, Qili, Qiyue, Rarpezit, Razimax, Razithro, Rezan, Ribotrex, Ribozith, Ricilina, Rizcin, Romycin, Rothin (Rakaposhi), Rozalid, Rozith, Ru Shuang Qi, Rui Qi, Rui Qi Lin, Rulide, Sai Jin Sha, Sai Le Xin, Sai Qi, Selimax, Sheng Nuo Ling, Shu Luo Kang, Simpli-3, Sisocin, Sitrox, Sohomac, Stromac, Su Shuang, Sumamed, Sumamox, Tailite, Talcilina, Tanezox, Te Li Xin, Tetris, Texis, Thoraxx, Throin, Thromaxin, Tong Tai Qi Li, Topt, Toraseptol, Tremac, Trex, Tri Azit, Triamid, Tridosil, Trimelin, Tritab, Tromiatlas, Tromix, Trozamil, Trozin, Trozocina, Trulimax, Tuoqi, Udox, Ultreon, Ultreon, Vectocilina, Vinzam, Visag, Vizicin, Wei Li Qinga, Wei Lu De, Wei Zong, Weihong, Xerexomair, Xi Le Xin, Xi Mei, Xin Da Kang, Xin Pu Rui, Xithrone, Ya Rui, Yan Sha, Yanic, Yi Nuo Da, Yi Song, Yi Xina, Yin Pei Kang, Yong Qi, You Ni Ke, Yu Qi, Z-3, Z-PAK, Zady, Zaiqi, Zaret, Zarom, Zathrin, Zedbac, Zeemide, Zenith, Zentavion, Zetamac, Zetamax, Zeto, Zetron, Zevlen, Zibramax, Zicho, Zigilex, Zikti, Zimacrol, Zimax, Zimicina, Zindel, Zinfect, Zirom, Zisrocin, Zistic, Zit-Od, Zitab, Zitax, Zithrax, Zithrin, Zithro-Due, Zithrobest, Zithrodose, Zithrogen, Zithrokan, Zithrolide, Zithromax, Zithrome, Zithromed, Zithroplus, Zithrotel, Zithrox, Zithroxyn, Zithtec, Zitinn, Zitmac, Zitraval, Zitrax, Zitrex, Zitric, Zitrim, Zitrobid, Zitrobiotic, Zithrolect, Zitrocin, Zitrocin, Zitrogram, Zitrolab, Zitromax, Zitroneo, Zitrotek, Ziyoazi, Zmax, Zocin, Zomax, Zotax, Zycin, and Zythrocin.

It is sold as a combination drug with cefixime as Anex-AZ, Azifine-C, Aziter-C, Brutacef-AZ, Cezee, Fixicom-AZ, Emtax-AZ, Olcefone-AZ, Starfix-AZ, Zeph-AZ, Zicin-CX, and Zifi-AZ.

It is also sold as a combination drug with nimesulide as Zitroflam; in a combination with tinidazole and fluconazole as Trivafluc, and in a combination with ambroxol as Zathrin-AX, Laz-AX and Azro-AM.

Research

COVID-19 
Despite early evidence showing azithromycin slowed down coronavirus multiplication in laboratory settings, further research indicates it to be ineffective as a treatment for COVID-19 in humans. After a large-scale trial showed no benefit of using azithromycin in treating COVID-19, the UK's National Institute for Health and Care Excellence (NICE) updated its guidance and no longer recommends the medication for COVID-19.

References

External links 

 

Antimalarial agents
Croatian inventions
Dimethylamino compounds
Macrolide antibiotics
Pfizer brands
World Health Organization essential medicines
Wikipedia medicine articles ready to translate